Megan Denise Fox (born May 16, 1986) is an American actress. She made her acting debut in the family film Holiday in the Sun (2001), which was followed by numerous supporting roles in film and television, such as the teen musical comedy Confessions of a Teenage Drama Queen (2004), as well as a starring role in the ABC sitcom Hope & Faith (2004–2006). Her breakout role was as Mikaela Banes in the blockbuster action film Transformers (2007), which she reprised in its sequel Transformers: Revenge of the Fallen (2009). She also portrayed the titular character in the horror comedy Jennifer's Body (2009), starred as April O'Neil in the superhero action film Teenage Mutant Ninja Turtles (2014) and its sequel Teenage Mutant Ninja Turtles: Out of the Shadows (2016), and starred as Reagan Lucas in the fifth and sixth seasons of the Fox sitcom New Girl (2016–2017).

Fox has also made appearances in numerous magazines such as Maxim, Rolling Stone, and FHM. She is the recipient of several accolades, including two Scream Awards and four Teen Choice Awards.

Early life
Megan Denise Fox was born on May 16, 1986, in Oak Ridge, Tennessee, to parents Gloria Darlene (née Cisson) and Franklin Thomas Fox. She spent her early childhood in nearby Rockwood. Fox's father, a parole officer, and her mother divorced when Fox was three years old. Her mother later remarried, and Fox and her sister were raised by her mother and her stepfather, Tony Tonachio. She was raised "very strictly Pentecostal", but later attended Catholic school for 12 years. She said that the two were "very strict" and that she was not allowed to have a boyfriend or invite friends to her house. She lived with her mother until she made enough money to support herself.

Fox began her training in dance and drama at age five, in Kingston, Tennessee. She attended a dance class at the community center there and was involved in Kingston Elementary School's chorus and the Kingston Clippers swim team. At age 10, after moving to St. Petersburg, Florida, Fox continued her training. When she was 13 years old, Fox began modeling after winning several awards at the 1999 American Modeling and Talent Convention in Hilton Head, South Carolina. Fox attended high school at Morningside Academy in Port St. Lucie until her junior year when she attended St. Lucie West Centennial High School.
 When she was 17 she tested out of school via correspondence, in order to move to Los Angeles, California.

Fox spoke freely about her time in school, stating that in middle school she was bullied and had to eat lunch in the bathroom to avoid being "pelted with ketchup packets." She said that the problem was not her looks, but that she had "always gotten along better with boys" and that "rubbed some people the wrong way." Fox also said that she was never popular in high school, and that "everyone hated me, and I was a total outcast, my friends were always guys, I have a very aggressive personality, and girls didn't like me for that. I've had only one great girlfriend my whole life." In the same interview, she mentions that she hated school and has "never been a big believer in formal education" and that "the education I was getting seemed irrelevant. So, I was sort of checked out on that part of it."

Career

2000–2009: Early roles and breakthrough 
In 2001, Fox made her acting debut in the romantic comedy Holiday in the Sun, as spoiled heiress Brianna Wallace and rival of Alex Stewart (Ashley Olsen), which was released direct-to-DVD on November 20, 2001. In the next several years, she guest-starred on the sitcoms What I Like About You and Two and a Half Men. Fox also appeared as an uncredited extra in the action film Bad Boys II (2003).

In 2004, Fox made her feature film debut opposite Lindsay Lohan in the musical comedy Confessions of a Teenage Drama Queen, playing the supporting role of Carla Santini, a rival of Lola (Lohan). She was also cast in a regular role on the ABC sitcom Hope & Faith, in which she portrayed Sydney Shanowski, replacing Nicole Paggi. Fox appeared in second and third seasons, until the series was cancelled by ABC in May 2006.

In 2007, Fox won the lead female role of Mikaela Banes in the 2007 live-action film Transformers, based on the toy and cartoon saga of the same name. Fox played the love interest of Shia LaBeouf's character Sam Witwicky. Fox was nominated for an MTV Movie Award in the category of "Breakthrough Performance", and was also nominated for three Teen Choice Awards. She had signed on for two more Transformers sequels, reprising her role as Mikaela in Transformers: Revenge of the Fallen. There was controversy surrounding Fox's appearance while filming the sequel when Michael Bay, the film's director, ordered the actress to gain ten pounds. The film was released worldwide on June 24, 2009, to box office success.

Fox was to star in the third installment, Transformers: Dark of the Moon, but was not included because of her statements comparing working under director Bay to working for Hitler. Bay said in June 2009 that Fox was fired on orders of executive producer Steven Spielberg, a claim Spielberg challenged.

In 2009, Fox had her first lead role since the Transformers series; she portrayed the title character in Jennifer's Body, written by Academy Award–winning screenwriter Diablo Cody. The film initially earned mixed to average reviews upon its release, with Fox's performance earning praise. However, the film grew a cult following over time and was critically reassessed as a "forgotten feminist classic". According to Cody, the film was marketed incorrectly by executives who focused their efforts on the young male audience.

In April 2009, she began filming the western superhero film Jonah Hex, in which she portrayed Tallulah Black / Leila, a gun-wielding beauty and Jonah Hex's (Josh Brolin) love interest. The film was released on June 18, 2010. Despite receiving top billing, Fox described her role in the film as being a cameo. Jonah Hex was a critical and commercial failure in the U.S., with its international distribution cancelled after its poor performance. The film was named the "worst picture of the year" by the Houston Film Critics Society.

2010–present: rise to prominence and current work 
Fox starred alongside Mickey Rourke in the drama Passion Play. After premiering at the Toronto International Film Festival, its conventional theatrical distribution was bypassed for a direct-to-video release, with only two screens briefly showing the film to fulfill contractual obligations. Rourke remarked that the film was "terrible. Another terrible movie." Fox appeared with Dominic Monaghan in the music video for Eminem and Rihanna's single "Love the Way You Lie". In 2012, Fox appeared briefly in Sacha Baron Cohen's comedy film The Dictator and had a featured role in Judd Apatow's comedy film This Is 40. She voiced the role of Lois Lane in the animated comedy film Robot Chicken DC Comics Special, an episode of the television comedy series Robot Chicken that aired as a one-off special during Cartoon Network's Adult Swim programming block on September 9, 2012.

In January 2013, Fox was featured in a Brazilian television commercial for Brahma beer. In February 2013, Fox set aside her differences with her former director Michael Bay and worked again with him on his reboot of Teenage Mutant Ninja Turtles (2014), starring as the lead human character of April O'Neil.

In 2015, Fox was cast in the role of Amelia Delthanis in the Plarium video game, Stormfall: Rise of Balur. In October 2015, it was confirmed that Fox would be temporarily replacing Zooey Deschanel in the television sitcom New Girl, following Deschanel's maternity leave. She starred as Reagan Lucas, appearing in the fifth and sixth seasons of the series. Her performance earned positive reviews from critics. In 2016, Fox reprised her role of April O'Neil in the sequel Teenage Mutant Ninja Turtles: Out of the Shadows.

On September 12, 2018, it was confirmed that Fox would star in the Korean War film The Battle of Jangsari, beside Korean actor Kim Myung-min. She played a lead role as Marguerite Higgins, an American news reporter.

In 2019, Fox starred in the mystery-fantasy film Above the Shadows opposite Olivia Thirlby and Alan Ritchson, directed by Claudia Myers. It was released on July 19, 2019, by Gravitas Ventures. That same year, Fox appeared in Zeroville directed by James Franco, which was previously shot in 2014. The film was panned by critics and performed poorly at the box office.

In 2020, Fox starred opposite Josh Duhamel in the family comedy film Think Like a Dog, which was released on video on demand on June 9, 2020. Also that year, she starred in the lead role of the action film Rogue, which was released on August 28, 2020.

In 2021 she starred in the thrillers, Midnight in the Switchgrass opposite Emile Hirsch and Bruce Willis, directed by Randall Emmett, and Till Death, directed by S.K. Dale. 

In 2022 Fox starred in the drama comedy Big Gold Brick, alongside Oscar Isaac, Andy García, Lucy Hale, and Emory Cohen, directed by Brian Petsos.

Upcoming projects 
Fox will feature as a voice role in Naya Legend of the Golden Dolphins, a 3D documentary film. The story is told by an ensemble cast, including Kate Winslet, Elliot Page, Gerard Butler, James Franco, Julian Lennon, Diego Luna, Cheech Marin, Whoopi Goldberg, Isabella Rossellini, and Daryl Hannah. Fox will play crime boss Alana in thriller film Johnny & Clyde with Tyson Ritter. Fox will play a role in the film Taurus, a musical drama, alongside Machine Gun Kelly, Naomi Wild, and Lil Tjay.

Public image

Status and persona
Chris Lee of the Los Angeles Times called Fox a "sex symbol of the highest order" and said she was "the first bona fide sex symbol of the 21st century." Craig Flaster of MTV stated, "Transformers broke Fox into the mainstream, immediately turning her into a household name and international sex symbol." She has been featured on various magazine covers and "hottest" and "most beautiful woman" lists throughout the years, such as Maxims Hot 100 lists and when FHM readers voted her the "Sexiest Woman in the World" in 2008. People named her one of 2012's and 2017's Most Beautiful at Every Age. Scholar Marc DiPaolo stated that Fox achieved instant fame as Mikaela in Transformers because a "highly sexualized, erotically idealized figure draped over a car or motorcycle invariably evokes lust in the heterosexual male onlooker" and Fox did this by leaning over a Camaro while wearing "a flimsy pink belly shirt" and short skirt, which read as "an unequivocal sex invite" to male viewers. The editors of Men's Health also credited the Camaro scene with contributing to Fox's fame.

Fox said all women in Hollywood are known and marketed as sex symbols, but that this is okay if the woman knows how to utilize the status. She created a character for her public image because she was unwilling to sacrifice her true self to the world. Scholars Wheeler Winston Dixon and Gwendolyn Audrey Foster disagreed that every woman in Hollywood is marketed as a sex symbol, and stated that Fox's "celebrity is based on what she admits is an entirely artificial construct designed for dissemination in the Internet age, a 21st-century media personality in every sense of the word." Part of her persona included making outlandish comments, which she said helped her reach her level of fame versus being "a typical starlet" who "said all the right things". Her tattoos, which she began getting at age 19 as a form of self-expression, helped popularize tattoo fashion. She had over nine known tattoos, including a picture of Marilyn Monroe's face on her right forearm and a quote on her shoulder. Author John Tehranian argued that Fox's Monroe tattoo enhanced her "implicit claims to Monroe's legacy as Hollywood's leading sex symbol." Fox ended up removing the Monroe tattoo in a series of laser surgeries because she felt that Monroe's life was full of negativity and she did not want to emulate it.

The media often compared Fox to actress Angelina Jolie, dubbing her the "next Angelina Jolie", which also affected her image. Amid this and reports that she was to replace Jolie in a new Lara Croft film, Fox commented that the comparisons indicate a lack of creativity on the part of the media, and attributed them to both she and Jolie being brunette, having tattoos, cursing, and mentioning and joking about sex, "which people find outrageous". Lynn Hirschberg of The New York Times opined that "the Jolie comparison would probably have been made by the media eventually, but Fox sped up the process" by "linking herself to Jolie" and that she "enjoyed creating entertaining copy" by telling "tales of darkness and lust."

In 2009, Fox's public image came under scrutiny when an unsigned letter from three crew members of Transformers defended director Michael Bay against accusations made by Fox about his on-set behavior, including a comparison with Adolf Hitler. In response to the letter alleging that Fox's on-set behavior is unpleasant and contrasts her public persona, Bay stated he does not condone the letter or Fox's "outlandish quotes", but "her crazy quips are part of her crazy charm", and that they still work well together. A production assistant who worked on Transformers also stated that he never saw Fox act inappropriately on set. Fox said the letter's claims were false, and that she had privately spoken with the parties involved. She said she was "very fortunate" to be a part of the franchise, and was looking forward to continuing her work. DiPaolo concluded that Fox's criticism of the media sexually objectifying girls and women was in stark contrast to her sex symbol status and that "her defiance of director Michael Bay and frequent outspoken comments" stifled her career.

Media exposure

The increased media exposure was difficult for Fox, who acknowledged being shy and insecure, to adjust to. It also positioned her as a potential role model, and later led to her being typecast. She rejected being a formal role model, but said that she could make young girls feel "strong and intelligent and be outspoken and fight for what they think is right" and that she was a different role model for girls that maybe America was not comfortable with. She considered being typecast as attractive an opportunity to surprise people when she gives a good performance in a film, but said she is interested in portraying less sexualized characters. MTV's Craig Flaster said that although Fox has "been typecast as the big-budget sex symbol", she has shown comedic range.

Fox's overexposure in the media led several men's websites, such as AskMen, to boycott her on August 4, 2009, although some refused to do so, feeling that the boycott was a publicity stunt and therefore hypocritical. In response to the media attention, Fox told magazine Nylon, in September of that year, that "[the studio] wanted to make sure [the film] would make $700 million, so they oversaturated the media with their stars" and that she did not "want to have people get completely sick of [her] before [she's] ever even done something legitimate." She became much less prominent in the media by 2010, after starring in the less commercially successful films Jonah Hex and Passion Play. That same year, Fox said, "My biggest regret is that I've assisted the media in making me into a cartoon character. I don't regret what has happened to me, but I regret the way I have dealt with it." Dixon and Foster stated, "The problem [Fox] faces is that the [image] construct has replaced the real in the minds of the public; and once established, a media persona is hard to recalibrate."

Personal life
In 2009, Fox was targeted by a group of fashion-motivated criminals known as the "Bling Ring", who robbed her then-boyfriend Brian Austin Green's home for access to Fox's possessions.

Fox has a form of brachydactyly called clubbed thumb, and has discussed her obsessive–compulsive disorder (OCD), insecurities, self-harming, and has acknowledged that she has low self-esteem. In 2013, she said that her Christian faith is still very important to her and she believes it keeps her grounded.

Fox and then-husband Green were supporters of Generosity Water, and funded the creation of over ten water wells for the organization.

With regard to relationships and her sexuality, Fox said that she has a general distrust and dislike of men, and that the perception of her as a "wild and crazy sexpot" is false because she is asocial and has only been sexually intimate with her "childhood sweetheart" and Brian Austin Green; she stated that she would rather stay at home instead of going out, and emphasized that she cannot have sex with someone she does not love. She is bisexual, and said she believes that "all humans are born with the ability to be attracted to both sexes". She stated in 2009, "I have no question in my mind about being bisexual. But I'm also a hypocrite: I would never date a girl who was bisexual, because that means they also sleep with men, and men are so dirty that I'd never want to sleep with a girl who had slept with a man."

Fox told InStyle in July 2021: "A girl would come up to me and be like: 'You had a lot to do with me, like identifying and understanding that I was gay or understanding that I was bisexual...' And that, of course, is by far, like, the most moving, rewarding thing that I have experienced in my life! To be a part of something that helped people figure that out, or helped people deal with that, or feel better about that. One of my favorite things that I get called, is being like, a bi icon and that is one of the things I am the most proud of!"

Relationships

Fox began dating actor Brian Austin Green in 2004, after meeting on the set of Hope & Faith; she was 18 years old, while he was 30. According to Fox, Green was initially hesitant to enter a relationship with her due to the age difference, stating, "I had to convince him that I was slightly more responsible and well-spoken and had other things to bring to the table besides being 18." They became engaged in November 2006. In February 2009, they ended their engagement, but were reported to have gotten engaged again on June 1, 2010. Fox maintained that she and Green had been continuously engaged since 2006.

Fox and Green married on June 24, 2010, in a private ceremony at the Four Seasons Resort on Maui. Together, they have three sons, born in 2012, 2014, and 2016. Fox was also a stepmother to Green's son from a previous relationship. Fox filed for divorce on August 21, 2015, a few days after she and Green announced their separation. By early 2016, they were back together and expecting their third child. On April 25, 2019, Fox filed to dismiss the divorce in Los Angeles, California.

In May 2020, Green announced that he and Fox had separated after nearly 10 years of marriage, and in November 2020, Fox filed for divorce from Green for a second time. The divorce was finalized on October 15, 2021.

In June 2020, she and singer Machine Gun Kelly went public about their relationship, several weeks after the release of Machine Gun Kelly's song "Bloody Valentine", whose music video features Fox. On January 12, 2022, Fox announced that the two were engaged.

Filmography

Film

Television

Video games

Music videos

Awards and nominations
Fox has received numerous awards and nominations, including four Teen Choice Awards and two Scream Awards.

References

External links

 
 

1986 births
21st-century American actresses
Actors from St. Petersburg, Florida
Actresses from Florida
Actresses from Tennessee
American child actresses
American child models
American film actresses
American people of English descent
American television actresses
American voice actresses
American bisexual actors
Bisexual actresses
Bisexual models
People with obsessive–compulsive disorder
Female models from Florida
Female models from Tennessee
LGBT Christians
LGBT people from Florida
LGBT people from Tennessee
Living people
People from Oak Ridge, Tennessee
People from Rockwood, Tennessee
21st-century American LGBT people